Michael "Micky" Clarkson is a former professional rugby league footballer who played in the 1990s and 2000s.

Playing career

Club career
Michael Clarkson made his début for Featherstone Rovers on Tuesday 5 May 1998.

References

External links
Stanley Rangers ARLFC - Roll of Honour

English rugby league players
Featherstone Rovers players
Living people
Place of birth missing (living people)
Rugby league props
Wakefield Trinity players
Year of birth missing (living people)